Indira is a Hindu/Sanskrit Indian popular feminine given name, which means "beauty" and "splendid".

Given name 
India's former Prime Minister Indira Gandhi (1917-1984) is the most notable figure bearing this name. Indira may also refer to—

 Indira Ampiot (born 2004), French model and Miss France 2023
 Indira Devi Chaudhurani (1873–1960), Bengali Indian literateur, author and musician, niece of Rabindranath Tagore
 Indira Devi (1892–1968), Indian autobiographer, princess turned queen and Maharaja of Cooch Behar Jitendra Narayan's wife
 Indira Hridayesh (1941–2021), Indian politician
 Indira Miri (1910–2004), Indian educationist
 Indira Sant (1914–2000), Indian poet
 Indira Parthasarathy, (born 1930), Indian writer and playwright
 Indira Jaising  (born 1940), Indian lawyer, feminist, human rights activist and solicitor
 Indira Freitas Johnson (born 1943), Indian artist and nonviolence educator
 Indira Kadambi (born 1969), Indian performer and dance teacher
 Indira Kastratović (born 1970), Macedonian handball player
 Indira Levak (born 1973), Croatian singer member of Colonia
 Indira Anant Maydeo, member of Indian National Congress
 Indira Naidoo (born 1968), Australian writer, journalist and television presenter
 Indira Nath (born 1938), Indian immunologist
 Indira Neville (born 1973), New Zealand comics artist, community organiser, musician and educationalist
 Indira Radić (born 14 June 1966), Serbian singer
 Indira Samarasekera (born 1952) Canadian-Sri Lankian twelfth president and vice-chancellor of the University of Alberta
 Indira Vizcaíno Silva (born 1987), Mexican politician
 Indira Spence (born 1986), Jamaican hurdler
 Indira Stefanianna (born 1946), American/Icelandic actress and singer
 Indira Talwani (born 1960), American lawyer and jurist
 Indira Terrero (born 1985), Cuban-Spanish sprinter
 Indira Varma (born 1973), English actress
 Indira Weis (born 1979), Indian-German actress and singer
 Indira Bajt (born 1980), Kazakhstani-Slovenian chess player

Fictional characters 
 Indira, from Abdul Rashid Kardar's 1950 film Dastan.

Hindu given names
Indian feminine given names